Odlar Yurdu University is a private university located in Baku, Azerbaijan.  It was founded in 1995, and became a degree granting institution in 1999.  The name is based on the official Azeri national motto, Odlar Yurdu, which is translated as "Land of Fire".

Admission to the Master of Business Administration (MBA) Program established in partnership with Georgia State University (Atlanta, USA). The masters are prepared with the four following concentrations:  Finances, International Business, Marketing and General Management.

External links
Odlar Yurdu University website

Universities in Baku
Educational institutions established in 1995
1995 establishments in Azerbaijan